Simulink is a MATLAB-based graphical programming environment for modeling, simulating and analyzing multidomain dynamical systems. Its primary interface is a graphical block diagramming tool and a customizable set of block libraries. It offers tight integration with the rest of the MATLAB environment and can either drive MATLAB or be scripted from it. Simulink is widely used in automatic control and digital signal processing for multidomain simulation and model-based design.

Add-on products 
MathWorks and other third-party hardware and software products can be used with Simulink. For example, Stateflow extends Simulink with a design environment for developing state machines and flow charts.

MathWorks claims that, coupled with another of their products, Simulink can automatically generate C source code for real-time implementation of systems. As the efficiency and flexibility of the code improves, this is becoming more widely adopted for production systems, in addition to being a tool for embedded system design work because of its flexibility and capacity for quick iteration. Embedded Coder creates code efficient enough for use in embedded systems.

Simulink Real-Time (formerly known as xPC Target), together with x86-based real-time systems, is an environment for simulating and testing Simulink and Stateflow models in real-time on the physical system.  Another MathWorks product also supports specific embedded targets.  When used with other generic products, Simulink and Stateflow can automatically generate synthesizable VHDL and Verilog.

Simulink Verification and Validation enables systematic verification and validation of models through modeling style checking, requirements traceability and model coverage analysis. Simulink Design Verifier uses formal methods to identify design errors like integer overflow, division by zero and dead logic, and generates test case scenarios for model checking within the Simulink environment.

SimEvents is used to add a library of graphical building blocks for modeling queuing systems to the Simulink environment, and to add an event-based simulation engine to the time-based simulation engine in Simulink.

Release history

See also
Dynamic simulation
Modelica
 OpenModelica
 JModelica.org
 Simcenter Amesim
 Dymola
 EcosimPro
 LabVIEW
 ModelCenter
 OpenMDAO
 rFpro
 Simplorer
 Web based simulation
 Wolfram SystemModeler
 Xcos
 20-sim
 SimInTech

References

External links
 

Cross-platform software
Linux software
Mathematical modeling
Numerical software
Simulation programming languages
Simulation software
Visual programming languages